A guarantor loan is a type of unsecured loan that requires a guarantor to co-sign the credit agreement. A guarantor is a person who agrees to repay the borrower’s debt should the borrower default on agreed repayments. The guarantor is often a family member or trusted friend who has a better credit history than the person taking out the loan and the arrangement is, therefore, viewed as less risky by the lender. A guarantor loan can, consequently, enable someone to borrow either more money, or the same amount at a lower rate of interest, than they would otherwise be able to secure through a more traditional type of loan.

Guarantors are often parents who want to help out their young adult children – it could be help raising the deposit for their first home, or it could be to buy a new car or complete a training course that will help them on the next step of their career. There are many reasons why young people may need such help and the fact they cannot obtain a loan themselves does not mean that they are not financially responsible or able to pay back the loan.
 
Guarantor loans are sometimes seen as alternatives to payday loans and associated with the sub-prime finance industry, due to them being aimed at people with a less than perfect credit score, because of missed payments towards debt in the past. However, this is only one aspect of guarantor loans. They are also aimed at young people who have no credit score, due to having never obtained credit in the past such as new graduates just embarking on their career - these people are often high earners with sensible financial habits so can afford the repayments but do not have the credit history to reassure the lender about the level of risk. As mainstream lending criteria are often automated and does not come with a personal review of the applicant's financial circumstances it is sometimes the only way a young adult in their first job can secure a loan.
 
Although guarantors are a relatively new introduction to the unsecured loan market, it's not uncommon for people to be asked to provide a guarantor to co-sign other forms of financial agreement, such as in residential letting contracts, where young people without previous references are often required to provide a guarantor  and in the mortgage industry, where guarantors are often used to help people obtain a mortgage when they would otherwise be declined due to being considered a credit risk.

Since the global financial crisis that started in 2008 there has been rapid growth in a whole range of personal loans such as guarantor loans that might be classed as alternative loans. These are loans that are not obtained through the traditional sources of mainstream banks or other lending institutions such as building societies but more typically through loan brokers and niche lenders. There are many reasons why people are increasingly choosing less conventional borrowing but the biggest two, by far are lack of availability and cost.

The strict lending criteria implemented since 2008 means that anyone with no credit history or an imperfect credit history either cannot secure a bank loan at all or will only be able to secure one at a high rate of interest.

However, guarantor loans are by no means a panacea for this situation - they themselves have high interest rates significantly above standard personal loans (albeit over shorter time periods) and pose a risk to the guarantor who may not be aware of the full extent of the commitment they are undertaking. Anyone being asked to act as a guarantor on a loan should ensure they fully understand their own liability.

These loans are sometimes used by angel investors to help out startup companies where the investor is unwilling or unable to provide direct funding.

Although these loans can be used to help provide financially responsible individuals with lending they could not otherwise access, it is important to recognize that they still do carry significant risks for the guarantor, who is liable for the full debt amount should the borrower be unable to make repayment. A report suggests that these loans could be as damaging as payday loans, with 43% of guarantors in the study unclear about their financial liability.

Consumer demographics

Users of guarantor loans are often people who would be rejected by mainstream lenders, such as banks and credit card providers, due to having less than perfect credit scores or no credit history at all, such as young people just starting out in their first job. In the UK alone, for example, there are an estimated seven million consumers who would not be eligible for a bank loan because of their credit score or their lack of credit history.

Some guarantor loan companies aim to position themselves as a better alternative to payday loans, by offering loans at lower APRs than those offered by payday loan companies, whilst still higher than prime-credit consumers can access through mainstream banks.

See also
Alternative financial services
Surety
Payday loan
Personal guarantee

References

Loans